Bellipadi Chandrahasa Alva (23 March 1923 – 6 November 1982), commonly known as B. C. Alva, was an Indian cricketer who played domestic cricket for Madras and Mysore cricket teams and represented India in two unofficial Test matches.

Early life 

Alva was born on 23 September 1923 in Puttur in South Canara, Madras Presidency. He had his schooling at St. Aloysius College, Mangalore and graduated in mathematics and engineering from St. Aloysius College, Bangalore and the Guindy Engineering College, Madras.  Alva worked as Chief Engineer, Bangalore Electricity Board and was Chairman of the Bhakra Beas Management Board, Chandigarh.

Cricket career 

Alva was a good middle-order batsman, medium-pace bowler and slip fielder. He represented Madras from 1944–45 to 1954–55 and captained the team in Ranji Trophy for three seasons. He also played for Mysore in 1957–58 and 1958–59. He was a part of the Indian national cricket team for two unofficial tests against Commonwealth XI in 1951–52.

Death 

Alva died at Bangalore of abdominal cancer on 6 November 1982.

References

External links
 

1923 births
1982 deaths
Tamil Nadu cricketers
Karnataka cricketers
South Zone cricketers
Indian cricketers
Deaths from cancer in India
Deaths from stomach cancer
People from Dakshina Kannada district
Cricketers from Karnataka